The de Bange 155 mm long cannon mle. 1877 (or more briefly the 155 L de Bange) was the French artillery piece that debuted the 155 mm caliber in widespread use today. Although obsolete by the beginning of World War I, the 155 L was nonetheless pressed into service and became the main counter-battery piece of the French army in the first two years of the war.

Development and 19th century deployment 
Drawing from the experiences of the Franco-Prussian War of 1870–1871, a French artillery committee met on 2 February 1874 to discuss new models for the French fortress and siege artillery. Among them was a piece in the 14 to 16 cm caliber range. After several meetings, on 16 April 1874 the committee settled on the 15.5 cm caliber. In the subsequent program-letter of the committee, dating from 21 April, the caliber was for the first time expressed as 155 millimeters. (The other two calibers decided by this committee were the 120 mm fortress and siege cannon and the 220 mm mortar.) Three different 155 mm prototypes were tested in Calais in 1876. The winner was Charles de Bange's model, and the French government ordered the first 300 pieces in November 1877.

In common with the other de Bange cannons, the 155 L had a hooped steel construction with gain-twist rifling. In its original (1877) conception, the cannon required a wooden platform from which to fire. Its recoil was absorbed simply by friction with the platform, and the 155 L had to be pushed back into position after every shot. In 1883, the Saint-Chamond hydraulic brake was introduced to better absorb recoil. This brake was a separate piece of equipment that anchored the cannon's carriage to the firing platform and returned it into position after about 110 cm of recoil.

Approximately 1,400 pieces of 155 L were built in the 19th century. Most were placed in France's numerous fortresses of the time (part of the Séré de Rivières system), most notably at Toul, Belfort, and Verdun. In 1882, about 200 pieces of 155 L were retained for offensive operations as siege artillery. In this role, each 155 L gun was drawn by ten horses.

French service in World War I 
At the turn of the century the de Bange cannons were rendered obsolete by the newer quick-firing guns using the French 75 recoil system, in which only the tube recoiled. Besides the technical obsolesce issue, the French army's doctrine at the time emphasizing mobility—"75 for everything" had become its universal mantra for field artillery. The 155 mm de Bange was therefore retained in forts and in reserve. On 2 August 1914, the French army had 1,392 pieces of 155 L de Bange, either in depots or in fixed positions; not a single one was part of the equipment of a mobile unit. On the eve of World War I, a typical French army corps was equipped with 120 75-mm cannons, while its German counterpart had 108 77-mm, 36 105-mm, and 16 150-mm pieces.

The first engagement of the 155 L was probably by the 8th Foot Artillery Regiment firing from place fortifiée d'Épinal during the Battle of the Mortagne on August 27. The first artillery duels of the war quickly convinced the French of their inferiority in heavy artillery relative to the Germans.  Thus it was seen necessary to enhance the mobility of their 155 mm guns. In October 1914, a program was started to fit the 155 L wheels with a system of metallic soles and gutters articulated together. The use of this system—known as cingoli or Bonagente wheel belts after the name of their Italian inventor—eliminated the laborious construction of wooden platforms. The cingoli tracks added 800 kilograms to the gun's total weight, but saved 5 tons of bedding material that otherwise had to be transported for the wooden platforms. The use of cingolis also reduced the time required to deploy the 155 mm gun from 5–6 hours to just one hour.

In an attempt to match the field artillery employed by the Germans, on 27 November 1914, each French army corps was endowed with a heavy artillery group. By November 30 of that year, 112 pieces of 155 L had already been mobilized for this purpose, although other types of heavy pieces were allotted for these groups as well.  In October–November 1915, a more structured organization was introduced, grouping the 155 L in mobile service in 30 heavy artillery regiments. Twenty of these regiments were horse drawn (totaling 320 pieces of 155 L), while ten regiments used motorized tractors for transportation and had a mixture of 155 L and 120 L de Bange guns. By 1 August 1916, the number of 155 L guns in mobile service (regardless of means of transportation) reached 738 pieces. The number of motorized 155 L guns also increased from 40 at the end of 1915 to 128 in July 1917.

A significant improvement in combat capabilities was achieved by boosting the powder charge of the 155 L, a measure made possible by the strong construction of the gun. Before 1914, the typical shell fired by the 155 L had a speed of 470 m/s and a range not exceeding 9,800 meters. With the boosted powder charge adopted in 1915, the shell speed increased to 561 m/s and gained 2,900 meters in range.

Starting in May 1916, the 155 L guns were progressively replaced by newer models of the same or similar caliber. The 155 L tubes were generally retired after they had 10,000 rounds fired through them. Owing to production shortages of the more modern artillery pieces that were supposed to replace the 155 L, a number of replacement barrels for the 155 L were however manufactured starting in 1916. These were of somewhat simplified construction, with constant-step rifling. The most distinctive visual difference between the old and new 155 L barrels is their lifting handle, which is longitudinally aligned with the main axis of the old barrels but is transversely mounted on the new barrels. The introduction of quick-firing, replacement materiel for the 155 L, which was initiated by the First Stage of the Realization of the Heavy Field Artillery Program of May 30, 1916 was still not finished in November 1918. The field artillery of each French army corps still had a battalion of 155 L model 1877 guns at this late date in the war.

Allied and interwar service 
Some 155 L guns were also given to France's allies during the war. Three 155 L were in the possession of the Romanian Army in 1915; this number had increased to four by 1918. The Romanian battery using them served with the 1st Siege Regiment of Bucharest (Romanian: Regimentul 1 Asediu) throughout the war.

Eighty 155 L were given by France to the Russian Empire, fifty in 1916 and thirty in 1917. These guns were inherited and also used by the Red Army during the Russian Civil War. For example, six 155 L were used by the 51st Rifle Division in their defense of Kakhovka in 1920. In the Soviet army organization, the 155 L pieces and other heavy guns were part of a central reserve called TAON (Russian: Тяжёлая артиллерия особого назначения).

At the end of June 1937, 32 of their 155 L guns manufactured under license in Perm were sent by the Soviets to the Republican forces fighting in the Spanish Civil War; these were sent aboard the ship Cabo de Santo Tomé, which unloaded its cargo at Cartagena. The Spanish Republicans formed 15 two-gun batteries with these, and kept two guns in reserve for training. One 155 L gun nicknamed "El Abuelo" (English: "The Grandfather") entered public consciousness after being deployed and photographed in Plaza de España of Madrid. (This was not however the only gun called "El Abuelo" during this conflict.)

World War II 
Some 305 155 L artillery pieces still equipped  French forts as of 10 May 1940; of these, 168 were deployed in the Maginot Line and 137 in the smaller works in the South-East.

In 1940, during the Winter War, France donated forty-eight 155 L cannons to Finland, as part of a larger artillery equipment help, but these arrived too late to take part in that conflict. The 155 L served however as the 155 K/77 during the Continuation War. All 48 guns were still in Finnish service in September 1941; the number of operational 155 K/77 pieces decreased to 42 by January 1944 and to just 19 by September of that year. The Finns used them with a 43.6 kg shell with a 5.7 kg explosive charge, attaining a range of 12.3 km. Four of the 155 L guns donated were converted to coastal guns under the designation 155/27 BaMk (De Bange Mk-lavetilla).

Ammunition 
The 155 L Mle 1877 used separate textile casing for the propellant.

The French used several shells with the Mle 1877:
 Obus à mitraille Mle 1877 (Shrapnel shell),  with 416 bullets and 288 fragments
 Obus en acier à balles Mle 1879-1915 (Shrapnel shell),  with 270 bullets
 Boîte à mitraille Mle 1881 (grapeshot, not a shell), with 429 bullets
 Other special shells

Conversions 
 Canon de 155 L modèle 1877/14 Schneider - mated the barrel of the mle 1877 with the box-trail carriage and hydro-pneumatic recoil mechanism of the 152 mm howitzer M1910 produced by Schneider for the Imperial Russian Army.
Canon de 155 L Modele 1917 Schneider - mated the carriage of the mle 1877/14 with a new barrel.
 Canon de 155 L modèle 1918 Schneider - mated the barrel of the mle 1877 with the box-trail carriage and recoil mechanism of the Schneider Canon de 155 C modèle 1917.
Materiel de 155 Sur Affut-truck Schneider - six coastal defense guns were converted to railroad guns.

Surviving examples

 two pieces in Oulu, Finland
 Salpa Line Museum, Miehikkälä, Finland
 The Artillery Museum of Finland, Hämeenlinna, Finland
 Verdun Memorial, Fleury-devant-Douaumont, France
 National Military Museum, Romania, Bucharest
 State Central Museum of Contemporary History of Russia, Moscow
 Central Armed Forces Museum, Moscow, Russia

See also 
 155 mm Creusot Long Tom

References

External links 

 Canon de 155 L Modèle 1877 at landships.info
 Photos of a 155 L piece at the Russian Central Armed Forces Museum where the piece is labeled "Французская 155-мм тяжёлая пушка системы Банжа обр. 1877"
 Wartime photos in a Finnish battery
 Le canon de 155 long modèle 1877 de Bange (has pages on various turret systems in which it was employed in French fortifications)
 Photos in Spanish service

Artillery of France
World War I guns
World War I field artillery of France

155 mm artillery